Ee (island) is one of 22 islands in the Aitutaki atoll of the Cook Islands. Located between the smaller islands of Angarei and Mangere, it is the third largest of the Aitutaki motus, after Tekopua and Akaiami, and measures 975m long and up to 410m wide.

References

Islands of Aitutaki